The 1999 Indian general election polls in Tamil Nadu were held for 39 seats in the state. The result was a victory for the National Democratic Alliance (NDA) which won 26 seats.  After leaving the NDA, All India Anna Dravida Munnetra Kazhagam, hoped to create some damage, but ended up losing 8 seats, compared to the 1998 Lok Sabha elections. This is also the first time that Dravida Munnetra Kazhagam, allied with the Bharatiya Janata Party, helping them have power at the national level for the next 5 years with the NDA, before they joined the UPA. The NDA, ended up losing 3 seats, compared to the election the year before, due to AIADMK leaving the NDA, but the seats were made up, because DMK left the united front and joined the NDA.

Seat allotments(1999)

National Democratic Alliance

AIADMK-Congress Alliance
Source: Indian Express

TMC(M) alliance

Voting and results

Results by Alliance

|-
!style="background-color:#E9E9E9" colspan=2 |Alliance/Party
! style="background-color:#E9E9E9;text-align:right;" |Seats won
! style="background-color:#E9E9E9;text-align:right;" |Change†
! style="background-color:#E9E9E9;text-align:right;" |Popular vote
! style="background-color:#E9E9E9;text-align:right;" |Vote %
! style="background-color:#E9E9E9;text-align:right;" |Adj. %‡
|-
! colspan=2 style="text-align:center;vertical-align:middle;background-color:#FF9933; color:white"|NDA
| 26
| +9
| 12,638,602
|style="text-align:center;vertical-align:middle;" colspan=2 | 46.4%
|-
|DMK
! style="background-color: #FF0000" |
| 12 	 	 	
| +7
| 6,298,832
| 23.1%
| 47.7%
|-
|PMK
! style="background-color: #800080" |
| 5  	
| –
| 2,236,821
| 8.2%
| 45.7%
|-
|BJP
! style="background-color: #FF9933" |
| 4 	
| +1
| 1,945,286
| 7.1%
| 
|-
|MDMK
! style="background-color: #FF00FF" |
| 4  	
| +1
| 1,620,527
| 6.0%
| 45.5%
|-
|MADMK
! style="background-color: #FFFF00" |
| 1
| +1
| 396,216
| 1.5%
| 51.5%
|-
|TRC
! style="background-color: " |
| 0
| -1
| 338,278
| 1.2%
| 46.3%
|-
! colspan=2 style="text-align:center;vertical-align:middle;background-color:#009900; color:white"|INC+
| 13
| -5
| 11,349,388
|style="text-align:center;vertical-align:middle;" colspan=2 | 41.7%
|-
|AIADMK
! style="background-color: #009900" |
| 10 	
| -8
| 6,992,003
| 25.7%
| 34.3%
|-
|INC
! style="background-color: #00FFFF" |
| 2  	
| +2
| 3,022,107
| 11.1%
| 
|-
|CPI(M)
! style="background-color: #000080" |
| 1  	
| +1
| 639,516
| 2.4%
| 
|-
|CPI
! style="background-color: " |
| 0  	
| –
| 695,762
| 2.6%
| 
|-
! colspan=2 style="text-align:center;vertical-align:middle;background-color:gray; color:white"|Others
| 0
| -4
| 3,243,289
|style="text-align:center;vertical-align:middle;" colspan=2 | 11.9%
|-
|TMC(M)
! style="background-color: " |
| 0
| -3
| 1,946,899	
| 7.2%
| 10.6%
|-
|JP
! style="background-color: " |
| 0
| -1
| 20,489	
| 0.1%
| 2.7%
|-
|IND
! style="background-color: " |
| 0
| –
| 339,948 	
| 1.3%
| 
|-
| style="text-align:center;" |Total
! style="background-color: " |
| 39
| –
| 27,231,279
| 100%
| style="text-align:center;" | –
|-
|}
†: Seat change represents seats won in terms of the current alliances, which is considerably different from the last election. ‡: Vote % reflects the percentage of votes the party received compared to the entire electorate that voted in this election. Adjusted (Adj.) Vote %, reflects the % of votes the party received per constituency that they contested.
Sources: Election Commission of India

List of Elected MPs

c-indicates sitting/incumbent M.P. from previous Lok Sabha (1998–1999)
Exit Poll Source: NES Election 1999 Analysis

Post-election Union Council of Ministers from Tamil Nadu
Source: The Tribune

Cabinet Ministers

Ministers of State (Independent charge)

Ministers of State

See also 
Elections in Tamil Nadu

References

External links
 Website of Election Commission of India
 CNN-IBN Lok Sabha Election History
 

1999 Indian general election
Indian general elections in Tamil Nadu
1990s in Tamil Nadu